Ronald Curt Copley (born 1966) is a retired United States Navy rear admiral and information warfare specialist who last served as director of the National Maritime Intelligence-Integration Office and commander of the Office of Naval Intelligence from June 18, 2021 to August 1, 2022. He previously served as deputy director of operations for combat support of the National Security Agency from 2019 to 2021. Copley graduated from the United States Naval Academy in 1988 with a B.S. degree in mechanical engineering and was commissioned as an intelligence officer.

References

1966 births
Living people
Place of birth missing (living people)
United States Naval Academy alumni
Recipients of the Legion of Merit
United States Navy admirals
Recipients of the Defense Superior Service Medal